North Western is a hamlet located in the Town of Western in Oneida County, New York. It is located on the Mohawk River northeast of Delta Reservoir.

References

Hamlets in Oneida County, New York
Hamlets in New York (state)